|}

La Coupe is a Group 3 flat horse race in France open to thoroughbreds aged four years or older. It is run at Longchamp over a distance of 2,000 metres (about 1¼ miles), and it is scheduled to take place each year in June.

History
The event was established in 1865, and the first edition was won by Fille de l'Air. The race was named after its original trophy, which at that time was worth 10,000 francs. It was initially open to horses aged three or older and contested over 3,200 metres. It was shortened to 3,000 metres in 1895.

La Coupe was cancelled throughout World War I, with no running from 1915 to 1919. During World War II, it was temporarily switched to Le Tremblay (1943) and Maisons-Laffitte (1944–45).

The race was closed to three-year-olds and cut to 2,600 metres in 1969. It was held at Chantilly in 1980, and from this point its distance was  2,400 metres. It returned to Chantilly in 1982, 1983 and 1985.

The distance of the race was reduced to 2,100 metres in 1991. It was cut to 2,000 metres in 1993. The event was staged at Saint-Cloud in 1994, Évry in 1995, and Saint-Cloud again in 1996.

Records
Most successful horse (2 wins):
 Nougat – 1875, 1876
 Lutin – 1894, 1895
 Elf – 1897, 1898
 Lesotho – 1987, 1988

Leading jockey (5 wins):
 Christophe Soumillon – Aubonne (2004), Stacelita (2010), Narniyn (2014), Air Pilot (2016), Telecaster (2020)

Leading trainer (9 wins):
 Tom Jennings – Fille de l'Air (1865), Gladiateur (1866), Nelusco (1868), Trocadero (1869), Mortemer (1870), Nougat (1875, 1876), Balagny (1878), Castillon (1880, dead-heat)

Leading owner (9 wins):
 Frédéric de Lagrange – Fille de l'Air (1865), Gladiateur (1866), Nelusco (1868), Trocadero (1869), Mortemer (1870), Nougat (1875, 1876), Balagny (1878), Castillon (1880, dead-heat)

Winners since 1980

Earlier winners

 1865: Fille de l'Air
 1866: Gladiateur
 1867: Normandie
 1868: Nelusco
 1869: Trocadero
 1870: Mortemer
 1871: no race
 1872: Clotaire
 1873: Barbillon
 1874: Franc Tireur
 1875: Nougat
 1876: Nougat
 1877: Stracchino
 1878: Balagny
 1879: Brie
 1880: Castillon / Fitz Plutus 
 1881: Le Destrier
 1882: Bariolet
 1883: Mademoiselle de Senlis
 1884: Formalite
 1885: Fra Diavolo
 1886: The Condor
 1887: Alger
 1888: Brisolier
 1889: Fligny
 1890: Prix Fixe
 1891: Barberousse
 1892: Amadis
 1893: Medium
 1894: Lutin
 1895: Lutin
 1896: Addy
 1897: Elf
 1898: Elf
 1899: Rembrandt
 1900: Apex
 1901:
 1902: Kakimono
 1903: Sans Profit
 1904: Iermak
 1905: Rataplan
 1906: Marsan
 1907: Moulins la Marche
 1908: L'Inconnu
 1909: Drapeau
 1910: Chulo
 1911: Rire aux Larmes
 1912: Corton
 1913: Amadou
 1914: Tortika
 1915–19: no race
 1920: Passebreul
 1921: Lord Frey
 1922: Binic
 1923: Sens
 1924: Rusa
 1925: Hohneck
 1926: The Wolf
 1927: Bois Josselyn
 1928: Mars en Careme
 1929: Feb
 1930: Zeus II
 1931: Raeburn
 1932: Taxodium
 1933: Bleu Horizon
 1934: Pons Legend
 1935: Bokbul
 1936: Le Vizir
 1937: Cormery
 1938: The Spy
 1939: Sesterce
 1940:
 1941: Marjolet
 1942: L'Aligote
 1943:
 1944:
 1945:
 1946: Flossie
 1947: Diable Gris
 1948:
 1949: Bye Bye
 1950: Miel Rosa
 1951: Belphegor
 1952: Ksiri
 1953: Romantisme
 1954: Ranchiquito
 1955: Pasithee
 1956: Jithaka
 1957:
 1958: Pepin le Bref
 1959: Birum
 1960: Norok
 1961: Galoubet
 1962: Saint Florent
 1963: Darling Boy
 1964: Waldmeister
 1965: Fantomas
 1966: Vleuten
 1967: Timour
 1968: Excalibur
 1969: Taineval
 1970: Park Top
 1971: High Game
 1972: Karoon
 1973: Sang Bleu
 1974: Balompie
 1975: Campo Moro
 1976: Beau Buck
 1977: Palei
 1978: Guadanini
 1979: African Hope

See also
 List of French flat horse races

References

 France Galop / Racing Post:
 france-galop.com – A Brief History: La Coupe.
 galop.courses-france.com – La Coupe – Palmarès depuis 1980.
 galopp-sieger.de – La Coupe.
 ifhaonline.org – International Federation of Horseracing Authorities – La Coupe (2019).
 pedigreequery.com – La Coupe – Longchamp.

Open middle distance horse races
Longchamp Racecourse
Horse races in France
Recurring sporting events established in 1865
1865 establishments in France